Cabin Life founded in April 2001, is a US magazine, focused on the vacation-home lifestyle for cabins, cottages, lakehomes and lodges.

Based in Duluth, Minnesota and published eight times a year, the magazine was founded and published by independently owned Fladmark Publishing until its sale to Kalmbach Publishing in September 2009.

The magazine was sold again in 2015 to Active Interest Media who merged the content of Cabin Life with its own Country's Best Cabins.

References

External links
 Cabin Life website

2001 establishments in Minnesota
Magazines published in the United States
Eight times annually magazines published in the United States
Lifestyle magazines published in the United States
Magazines established in 2001
Magazines disestablished in 2015
Magazines published in Minnesota
Mass media in Duluth, Minnesota